The  are a Japanese cinema awards ceremony which recognizes excellence in the pink film genre. Readers of the paper elect the winners of the awards, which have been held annually since 2004. Honors go to the best three films of the year—Gold, Silver and Pearl awards—and to the best actresses. Actress awards are Best Actress, Best Supporting Actress, Best New Actress, and since 2006, Outstanding Performance by an Actress.

2004

 Best Actress: Mayu Asada
 Best Supporting Actress: Yumika Hayashi, Chinami Hayashida
 Best New Actress: Sora Aoi, Mai Sakurazuki, Konatsu, Kyōko Natsume

2005

 Best Actress: Yumika Hayashi
 Best Supporting Actress: Lemon Hanazawa
 Best New Actress: Mari Yamaguchi, Sakurako Kaoru, Komari Awashima, Erina Aoyama

2006

 Best Actress: Akiho Yoshizawa
 Best Supporting Actress: Kyōko Kazama
 Outstanding Performance by an Actress: Erina Aoyama, Komari Awashima, Rinako Hirasawa
 Best New Actress: Yuria Hidaka

2007

 Best Actress: Rinako Hirasawa
 Best Supporting Actress: Kyōko Kazama
 Outstanding Performance by an Actress: Lemon Hanazawa, Kiri Kōda
 Best New Actress: Rina Yūki

2008

 Best Actress: Maki Tomoda
 Best Supporting Actress: Kiri Kōda
 Best New Actress: Aya
 Outstanding Performance by an Actress: Komari Awashima, Yuria Hidaka

2009

 Note: Three-way tie for second-place this year. No Silver or Pearl awards given.
 Best Actress: Ami Natsui
 Best Supporting Actress: Minami Aoyama
 Best New Actress: Nao Masaki
 Outstanding Performance by an Actress: Riri Kōda, Mayuko Sasaki, Yuria Hidaka, Yumi Yoshiyuki

2010
Gold-潮吹き花嫁の性白書(shiofuki hanayomeno seihakusyo)
 Best Actress: Kaho Kasumi

Bibliography

Notes

External links
 Pinky Ribbon Award site

Awards established in 2004
Japanese awards
Japanese film awards
Japanese pornography
Lists of films by award
Pornographic film awards